A certificate of disposition is a New York court document that indicates the current status of a case or its final disposition.

Availability
Certificates of Disposition are available from the clerk's office in either the Criminal Court or the Supreme Court, Criminal Term, both trial courts in New York City.  It is also available in all other city courts in Upstate New York, for example, Binghamton, New York, and Plattsburgh, New York.

Only the criminal defendant, defendants representation, or a person with written and notarized permission of the defendant, can access this court record.

There are 13 branches of New York City Criminal Courts, and five branches of the Supreme Court handling felonies in New York City.  There are also 61 city courts outside of New York City.

See also
 Allocution
 Transcript
 Law of New York
 Judiciary of New York

References

Legal documents
New York (state) law
Government of New York City
Court reporting